Tom Kersley (9 February 1879 – 4 December 1927) was an English cricketer. Kersley's batting style is unknown, though it is known he was a fast-medium bowler, but it is not known with which arm he bowled with. He was born at Norbiton, Surrey.

Kersley made his first-class debut for Surrey against Nottinghamshire at Trent Bridge in the 1899 County Championship. He made two further first-class appearances for Surrey in 1899, against Cambridge University and Warwickshire. In his three matches, he took a total of 7 wickets at an average of 20.71, with best figures of 3/36. With the bat, he scored a total of 23 runs at a batting average of 7.66, with a highest score of 15 not out,

He died at Folkestone, Kent on 4 December 1927.

References

External links
Tom Kersley at Cricinfo
Tom Kersley at CricketArchive

1879 births
1927 deaths
People from the Royal Borough of Kingston upon Thames
English cricketers
Surrey cricketers